Arthur Frederick "Solly" Hofman (October 29, 1882 – March 10, 1956) was an American Major League Baseball player from 1903 to 1916. He played the majority of his 1,194 games in the outfield.

His nickname was "Circus Solly". Some attribute this name to a comic strip of the era, while others attribute it to spectacular catches while fielding. He is considered by some to be the first great utility player in baseball due to his versatility.

In the 1906 World Series, Hofman batted leadoff and played center field for the Chicago Cubs against their crosstown rivals, the Chicago White Sox. He had seven hits and three walks during the Series, batting .304. Hofman was the Cubs' center fielder on October 14, 1908 when they defeated the Detroit Tigers 2-0 to win the 1908 World Series. He hit .316 for the Series. It was the Cubs' last championship until 2016.

In 1,194 games over 14 seasons, Hofman compiled a .269 batting average (1095-for-4072) with 554 runs, 162 doubles, 60 triples, 19 home runs, 498 RBI, 208 stolen bases, 421 base on balls, 323 strikeouts, .340 on-base percentage and .352 slugging percentage. Defensively, he recorded a .966 fielding percentage at all positions except catcher. In three World Series covering 16 games (1906, 1908, 1910), he batted .298 (17-for-57) with 7 runs, 8 RBI and 3 stolen bases.

He was the uncle of Bobby Hofman of the New York Giants.

References

External links

 SABR biography
 

1882 births
1956 deaths
Pittsburgh Pirates players
Chicago Cubs players
Brooklyn Tip-Tops players
Buffalo Blues players
New York Yankees players
Major League Baseball center fielders
Evansville River Rats players
Des Moines Prohibitionists players
Nashville Vols players
Baseball players from St. Louis